Soekarwo  (born 16 June 1950), popularly known as Pakde Karwo or Uncle Karwo, is an Indonesian politician and former governor of East Java.

In 2019, he was one of nine advisors appointed to President Joko Widodo's Presidential Advisory Council.

Biography 
Soekarwo was educated at State Elementary School Palur (1962), State Junior High School 2 Ponorogo (1965) and Social Senior High School Madiun (1969). He obtained his master's degree in Law at Universitas Airlangga (Surabaya) in (1979), and subsequently his law abschluss at the University of Surabaya (1996), and his doctorate at Universitas Diponegoro, Semarang (2004).

Governorship
When East Java held a gubernatorial election in 2008, Soekarwo announced his candidacy and was supported by Partai Amanat Nasional (PAN) and Partai Demokrat (Democratic Party). His running-mate was Saifullah Yusuf or Gus Ipul, a former minister in President Yudhoyono's cabinet. Soekarwo won the first round with 26% votes, but because no candidate won over 30%, a second round had to be held. Soekarwo won again but with a closer margin. His rival, Khofifah, demanded a new round after alleged election fraud. A third round was held and won by Soekarwo. He was sworn in as governor in February 2009.

Soekarwo stood for re-election in the 2013 gubernatorial election. After much speculation about his running mate, Soekarwo announced that Saifullah Yusuf would again be his running-mate.

See also
List of Governors of East Java

References 
 Profil singkat Soekarwo - Saifullah Yusuf di Kompas Online
 Website

Governors of East Java
1950 births
Living people
Diponegoro University alumni